U-Yal (Uyal) is a rural locality (a village) in Tyuldinsky Selsoviet, Kaltasinsky District, Bashkortostan, Russia. The population was 13 as of 2010. There is 1 street.

Geography 
U-Yal is located 13 km north of Kaltasy (the district's administrative centre) by road. Tyuldi is the nearest rural locality.

References 

Rural localities in Kaltasinsky District